The Oxford Educational Institutions are private educational institutions founded in 1974 by S. Narasa Raju. The Oxford Educational Institutions are the academic arm of the Children's Education Society (Regd.) in Bangalore, Karnataka State of India. The Oxford Educational Institutions cover from K.G. to postgraduate courses.

Overview
The Oxford Educational Institutions under the aegis of Children’s Education Society, headed by the educationist Vidyashree Shri. S Narasa Raju, has 32 educational institutions from KG to postgraduate ourses including Dentistry, Nursing, Pharmacy, Physiotherapy, Engineering, Computer Education, Management, Life Science and Law.

The institution is under the leadership of Shri. S.N.V.L Narasimha Raju, Executive Director.
The Oxford College of Science ranked first amongst private colleges in Karnataka for three consecutive years (2005, 2006, 2007) and ranked 25th amongst science colleges in India in 2007.

Colleges/institutions

Medical Sciences
       The Oxford Medical College
	The Oxford Dental College
	Oxford Physiotherapy College
	Oxford Nursing College
	Oxford Pharmacy College

Engineering 
	Engineering
	Polytechnic

Management 
	Business Management
	Hotel & Tourism Management

Arts, Science and Humanities 
	College of Science
	College of Law
	College of Education
	College of Arts
The Oxford School of Architecture

Primary education 
	PU College
	English Nursing, Higher Primary and High School
	Kannada Nursing, Higher Primary and High School
	Senior Secondary School (CBSE)
	English School (ICSE/ISC)
	Teachers Training Institute (TCH/D.Ed/NTT)
	Interactive Designer

References

Private schools in Bangalore
Educational institutions established in 1974